James Hawkins was an Irish Anglican bishop in the 18th and 19th centuries.

A former Dean of Emly (1766–1775), Hawkins was the Bishop of Dromore from 1775 to 1780 and Bishop of Raphoe from then until his death on 23 June 1807.

Family
He married Catherine, the daughter of Gilbert Keene and niece of William Whitshed; they had four sons and three daughters. His son James adopted the additional surname of Whitshed and was created first Baronet Whitshed-Hawkins. His son Thomas became Dean of Clonfert in 1812.

References

Anglican bishops of Dromore
Anglican bishops of Raphoe
18th-century Anglican bishops in Ireland
19th-century Anglican bishops in Ireland
1807 deaths
Deans of Emly
Year of birth unknown